Hasinur Rahman Bir Protik is a former Bangladesh Army and Rapid Action Battalion officer. He had the rank of Lieutenant Colonel when he was sacked from the Army. He was a victim of Forced Disappearance in Bangladesh (from August 2018 to February 2020) and had been missing for 16 months.

Career
Hasinur was commissioned in the 10th long course of Bangladesh Military Academy in the early 1980s. 

On 3 January 2004 Hasinur, then a commander in Bangladesh Rifles, seized 40 Anti-personnel and Anti-tank mines. They also seized rocket launchers and chargers after a gunfight with tribal insurgents. 

Hasinur served as the commanding officer of Rapid Action Battalion 5 in Rajshahi. On 3 September 2005, he arrived in Chittagong with two squads of Rab personal from Rab-5 and meet with officials of Rab-7 in Chittagong. He set out with an additional squad from Rab-7 to Naikhongchhari Upazila where they were joined by a team from Bangladesh Rifles. They recovered 20 AK-47 rifles and nearly 8 thousand bullets after searching the area.

In 2005-6, Hasinur commanded Rab-7 in Chittagong. In November 2006, he recovered bombs in Cox's Bazar. In April 2006, he led Operation Pahartoli to arrested a members of Jamaat-ul-Mujahideen Bangladesh.

Hasinur was dismissed from Bangladesh Army on allegations of involvement with militancy. He was stationed at the Army Training and Doctrine Command when he was sacked. He had been charged with sedition.

Disappearance and aftermath
On 8 August 2018, Hasinur was picked up in Mirpur DOHS near his house by 14 or 15 men. According to his family members those who picked him up were wearing jackets of Detective Branch of Bangladesh Police. His family members filled a General Diary with Pallabi police station. Bangladesh Police recovered his licensed pistol from the site of his abduction and raided his house looking for his licensed shotgun, which according to his family he had sold.

On 22 February 2020, Hasinur was dropped of home. He was speaking incoherently and according to his family had high blood pressure. He had been missing for 16 months. According to him, he was detained at Directorate General of Forces Intelligence's secret prison, Aynaghar.

See also
List of solved missing person cases

References

2010s missing person cases
Bangladesh Army officers
Enforced disappearances in Bangladesh
Formerly missing people
Living people
Missing person cases in Bangladesh
Rapid Action Battalion officers
Recipients of the Bir Protik
Year of birth missing (living people)